Mingul may refer to:

 Mingul, Albania, a village in Gjirokastër District, Albania
 Mingol, a village in Iran also known as Mingul